Journalism Practice is a peer-reviewed academic journal covering the professional practice and relevance of journalism. The founding editor-in-chief was Bob Franklin (Cardiff University). Franklin was succeeded by Bonnie Brennen (Marquette University). The journal was established in 2007 and is published by Routledge. According to the Journal Citation Reports, the journal has a 2017 impact factor of 1.678.

References

External links

English-language journals
Journalism journals
Routledge academic journals
Publications established in 2007